The Forbes Top 40 was an annual list of 40 highest-paid entertainers compiled and published by Forbes magazine from 1987 until 1998. In the next year, 1999, they created Forbes Celebrity 100. The list was published every September, compiled by using the income of performers over two years to overcome the year-to-year volatility of a performer's income.

Forbes representatives said that those individual are "more than entertainers, they are businesses", declaring: "Not only do they create wealth for the entertainment industry and their business sponsors, they create wealth for the nation in exportable merchandize in the form of TV programming, motion pictures, and videocassette and music recordings".

Forbes Top 40 lists
Below is the top 10 for each year since the list's inception.

1980s

1990s

1999—present

Statistics

Forbes report
According to Forbes, after list' 11th anniversary, Steven Spielberg and Bill Cosby were the individuals with the most appearances at the top, with three each. The Beatles attained the highest ranked for non-Americans.

Historical money-earning views
Forbes 20th-century lists were predominantly dominated by male figures. In 1996 alone, only four female celebrities entered the Top 40 list (Oprah Winfrey ranked 1, Roseanne Barr at 25, Mariah Carey in the 33-position, and Sandra Bullock in the 40 place). However, Winfrey gained a perennial position even above many individuals regardless of gender, which has been maintained since the inception of the Forbes Celebrity 100 in 1999.

While lists of that time included several musicians, dominated by them in many reports, high ranks were not usually attained by female artists. Like Winfrey, Madonna was an almost premier exception with academic E. Ann Kaplan describing in 1993, that she "has entered the public sphere as an entrepreneur earning a lot of money, something that is not considered natural for women".

On the other hand, lists were dominated by American personalities rather than foreigners.

See also
 Forbes list of highest-earning musicians

References 

Annual magazine issues
Lists of celebrities
Forbes lists